Studio B may refer to:

 "Studio B with Shepard Smith", also known as Bill Hemmer Reports
 Studio B (group), a British electronic music trio
 Studio B Productions, an animation studio in Vancouver, BC
 RCA Studio B, a recording studio in Nashville
 RTV Studio B, a broadcasting company in Belgrade, Serbia
 A television studio where American Bandstand was filmed from 1957-1964